The year 1923 in architecture involved some significant architectural events and new buildings.

Events
 Vers une architecture by Le Corbusier (later translated into English as Towards a New Architecture) is published.
 Bauhaus expressionist architecture phase ends.
 Liebenberg and Kaplan architectural practice established in Minneapolis.

Buildings and structures

Buildings opened
June 23 – Stockholm City Hall, designed by Ragnar Östberg.
December 26 – Ottawa Auditorium, Canada (demolished 1967).

Buildings completed
 Coedfa (residence), The Close, Llanfairfechan, North Wales, designed by Herbert Luck North.
 Imperial Hotel, Tokyo, designed by Frank Lloyd Wright.
 Église Notre-Dame du Raincy in France, designed by Auguste Perret.
 Pershing Square Building in New York, New York, designed by Sloan & Robertson and York and Sawyer.

Awards
AIA Gold Medal – Henry Bacon
RIBA Royal Gold Medal – John James Burnet
Grand Prix de Rome, architecture: Jean-Baptiste Mathon

Births
March 2 – Sam Scorer, English architect (died 2003)
June 5 – Yona Friedman, Hungarian born French architect and architectural theorist ("mobile architecture") (died 2020)
June 24 – Peter Womersley, British architect (died 1993)
June 25 – Harry Seidler, Austrian-born Australian Modernist architect (died 2006)
September 18 – Peter Smithson, English New Brutalist architect, husband and partner of Alison Smithson (died 2003)
September 25 – Leonardo Benevolo, Italian historian of modern architecture (died 2017)
December 12 – Richard Gilbert Scott, English architect (died 2017)
December 19 – Alexander Cvijanović, Yugoslav/American architect (died 2019)
December 25 – Jack Zunz, South African-born structural engineer (died 2018)
Eulie Chowdhury, Indian architect (died 1995)

Deaths
May 19 – Frank Darling, Canadian architect and promoter of the Beaux-Arts style (born 1850)
October 25 – Robert S. Roeschlaub, Colorado architect (born 1843)
November 24 – Michel de Klerk, Dutch Amsterdam School architect (born 1884)
December 27 – Gustave Eiffel, French civil engineer and architect (born 1832)

References